Sawan Prabash (born 18 February 1999) is a Sri Lankan cricketer. He made his List A debut on 14 December 2019, for Lankan Cricket Club in the 2019–20 Invitation Limited Over Tournament.

References

External links
 

1999 births
Living people
Sri Lankan cricketers
Lankan Cricket Club cricketers
Place of birth missing (living people)